Park Bit-na (Korean: 박빛나, born June 16, 1985 in Seoul, South Korea) is a South Korean former competitive figure skater. She is the 3-time(1999–2002 & 2004) South Korean national champion. She represented South Korea at the 2002 Winter Olympics, where she placed 26th.

Programs

Results
JGP: Junior Grand Prix

References

External links
 

South Korean female single skaters
Olympic figure skaters of South Korea
Figure skaters at the 2002 Winter Olympics
Living people
Figure skaters from Seoul
1985 births
Competitors at the 2005 Winter Universiade